Capoeta erhani, also known as the Ceyhan scraper, is a Turkish species of freshwater cyprinid fish in the genus Capoeta.

It lives in the Ceyhan River drainage, in many kinds of streams and also in reservoirs. These waters are in a relatively good ecological shape, and the species is therefore considered to be safe (least concern).

References 

Erhani
Endemic fauna of Turkey
Fish of Turkey
Taxa named by Davut Turan
Taxa named by Maurice Kottelat
Taxa named by Fitnat Güler Ekmekçi
Fish described in 2008